Government Medical College and Hospital, Sundargarh, established in 2022, is a full-fledged tertiary government medical college and hospital. The Government medical college and hospital Sundargarh is located at is built in the hilly terrains of a quaint, picturesque village of Sankara that covers 21 acres campus. Sundargarh is a mineral rich district in famous for its natural scenic beauty, hills, mountains, dense forest, natural waterfalls and mineral resources. This mineral rich district is enriched with iron, coal etc. and is a part of the industrial backbone of India.

The Government medical college and hospital Sundargarh was initiated to provide optimum health facilities to improve the doctor population ratio to the population of the district. Which is the mostly tribal. The foundation stone was laid by Honourable Chief Minister Sri Naveen Patnaik on Dt.22.01.2014.  The college and hospital building was completed within a span of 7 Years and was functional by Dt.25.06.2021. The hospital building was used as a covid facility during the covid-19 pandemic. The institution is located in the suburban sprawl of 21 acres adjacent to the Rourkela & Sambalpur Biju Express Highway and in well connected with Airways, Railways and Roadways. The nearest airport is located at Jharsuguda is about 22 km, railway station at Jharsuguda is about 30 km.

The former/erstwhile DHH is attached as the teaching hospital to the Government medical college and hospital which is 3 km away. Meanwhile the 500 bedded hospital of the Government medical college and hospital is being fitted with high end equipment’s and is expected to be functional in a phase wise manner. The yearly undergraduate student intake is 100 (85 from state and 15 from all india quota) from the year 2022.

The college campus includes Administrative, Academic Blocks, Lecture Theatres, Laboratories, Library, Cafeteria, Community Hall, Boys Hostel, Girls Hostel, Residential Quarters for faculties, Residents, Nurses and Non-teaching staff. The entire colleges centrally air conditioned to facilitate optimum learning at all hours. This college offers the Bachelor of Medicine and Bachelor of Surgery (MBBS) course.

Courses
Government Medical College and Hospital, Sundargarh undertakes education and training of 100 students. Selection to the college is done on the basis of merit through the National Eligibility and Entrance Test.

Departments
Clinical - 
General Medicine,	
Paediatrics,
Tuberculosis & Respiratory Diseases,	
Psychiatry,
General Surgery,
Orthopaedics,
Oto-Rhino-Laryngology,
Ophthalmology,	
Obstetrics & Gynaecology,
Anaesthesiology,	
Dentistry,
Dermatology

Para-clinical-
Biochemistry,
Pathology,
Microbiology,	
Forensic Medicine and Toxicology,	
Community Medicine

Non-Clinical -
Anatomy,	
Physiology,
Pharmacology

Affiliation
The college is affiliated with the Sambalpur University and is recognized by the National Medical Commission.

References

Medical colleges in Odisha
Universities and colleges in Odisha
Educational institutions established in 2022
2022 establishments in Odisha